Claude Allen Greene IV, (born April 10, 1977) is the former director of athletics for Auburn University from 2018 to 2022. He previously served as athletic director for the University at Buffalo, and as assistant athletic director for the University of Mississippi. Greene attended college at the University of Notre Dame, and was a two-year starter on the Notre Dame Fighting Irish baseball team. He was a ninth-round draft pick of the New York Yankees in the 1998 Major League Baseball draft, and went on to a four-year career in the minor leagues for the Yankees, playing for the Oneonta Yankees, Greensboro Bats, Tampa Yankees, and Elmira Pioneers. He grew up in Bellevue, Washington and attended O'Dea High School in Seattle, playing baseball and basketball, graduating 1995.

References

External links

Auburn Tigers bio
Buffalo Bulls bio
Notre Dame Fighting Irish bio

Living people
1977 births
African-American college athletic directors in the United States
Auburn Tigers athletic directors
Buffalo Bulls athletic directors
Elmira Pioneers players
Greensboro Bats players
Notre Dame Fighting Irish baseball players
Oneonta Yankees players
Tampa Yankees players
21st-century African-American sportspeople
African-American baseball players
20th-century African-American sportspeople
Baseball players from Seattle